Tomomingi is a genus of African jumping spiders that was first described by T. Szűts & N. Scharff in 2009.

Species
 it contains eight species, found only in Africa:
Tomomingi holmi (Prószyński & Zabka, 1983) – Kenya
Tomomingi keinoi (Prószyński & Zabka, 1983) – Kenya
Tomomingi kikuyu (Prószyński & Zabka, 1983) – Kenya
Tomomingi nywele Szüts & Scharff, 2009 – Tanzania
Tomomingi silvae Szüts & Scharff, 2009 – Equatorial Guinea (Bioko)
Tomomingi sjostedti (Lessert, 1925) – Kenya, Tanzania
Tomomingi szutsi Wesolowska & Haddad, 2013 – South Africa
Tomomingi wastani Szüts & Scharff, 2009 (type) – Tanzania

References

Salticidae
Salticidae genera
Spiders of Africa